Teresa Mattei, also known as Teresita (1 February 1921 – 12 March 2013) was an Italian partisan and politician.

Background
Born in Genoa, in 1938 Mattei was expelled from all schools of the Kingdom of Italy for openly criticizing in her classroom the Racial laws. Graduating in philosophy at the University of Florence in 1944, she joined the partisans under the nom de guerre of Partigiana Chicchi. She took part in the murder of philosopher and Fascist minister Giovanni Gentile. 

After the war, Mattei was a candidate for the Communist Party to the Constituent Assembly, in which she served as a bureau secretary. Mattei was the youngest to be elected to the Constituent Assembly and was thus called "the girl of Montecitorio".

She married Bruno Sanguinetti, with whom she had a son, writer Gianfranco Sanguinetti.

Expulsion
In 1957 Mattei was expelled from the Italian Communist Party because of her opposition to Stalinism and to the Togliatti politics. Mattei felt that the French symbols of IWD, violets and lilies of the valley, were too scarce and expensive to be used in poor, rural Italian areas, so she proposed the mimosa as an alternative.

She died in Lari, Tuscany, aged 92, the last living female member of the Constituent Assembly of Italy.

References 

1921 births
2013 deaths
Italian socialists
Politicians from Genoa
Italian resistance movement members
Italian Communist Party politicians
Marxist feminists
Italian socialist feminists
20th-century Italian politicians
University of Florence alumni
20th-century Italian women politicians